The Enemy's Baby is a 1913 American drama film, possibly directed by  D. W. Griffith.

Cast
 Lionel Barrymore as Ben Brown
 William J. Butler as Sam Miller, the Grandfather
 Kate Bruce as Sam Miller's Wife
 Harry Carey as Miller
 Claire McDowell as Miller's Wife
 William Courtright as Extra
 John T. Dillon as Extra
 Charles Gorman as The Sheriff

See also
 List of American films of 1913
 Harry Carey filmography
 D. W. Griffith filmography
 Lionel Barrymore filmography

References

External links

1913 films
1913 drama films
1913 short films
Silent American drama films
American silent short films
American black-and-white films
Films directed by D. W. Griffith
1910s American films
1910s English-language films